The United States Shipping Board (USSB) was established as an emergency agency by the 1916 Shipping Act (39 Stat. 729), on September 7, 1916. The United States Shipping Board's task was to increase the number of US ships supporting the World War I efforts. United States Shipping Board program ended on March 2, 1934.

Initiation 
The United States' maritime position had been eroding for decades with some Congressional concern, some remedies actually worsening the situation, with European shipping companies dominating overseas trade and just over 10% of the value of trade carried in U.S. owned ships. The 1916 act was the result of Congressional efforts to create a board to address the problem dating from 1914. At this time the legislation was not a part of any war effort with specific intent as stated in the act:

"An Act to establish a United States Shipping Board for the purpose of encouraging, developing, and creating a naval auxiliary and naval reserve and a Merchant Marine to meet the requirements of the commerce of the United States with its territories and possessions and with foreign countries; to regulate carriers by water engaged in the foreign and interstate commerce of the United States for other purposes."

A board of five commissioners was to be appointed by the president with confirmation by the United States Senate as the United States Shipping Board (USSB) to acquire and construct suitable vessels and to create corporations under its control to execute the programs. In essence, the USSB was given "complete control over American ships and shipping".

President Woodrow Wilson made public his nominations for the board on 22 December 1916 with some dissatisfaction in the shipping industry about particular nominees and the board's power to set ocean freight rates raising particular concern and skepticism. The initial nominees were: William Denman (chairman), instrumental in drafting the legislation for the establishment of the USSB, for a term of six years, Bernard N. Baker for five years, John A. Donald for four years, James B. White for three years and Theodore Brent for a two-year term. The members of the board gathered in Washington the first week of January 1917 to plan and organize while awaiting confirmation which came in late January with the formal organization of the USSB being on 30 January.

United States vessels had suffered a disadvantage and the laws passed by Congress had in some cases had the effect of giving advantage to European shipping instead of the desired effect so that the country was heavily dependent on foreign shipping. With the outbreak of war in Europe the national fleets of the warring countries became involved in those countries' wartime efforts and were withdrawn from commercial trade vital to United States commerce. One initial step was granting authority to the President to allow registration of foreign built ships owned by United States companies to enter the United States registry and operate under the United States flag and repeal certain penalties for those using foreign built vessels. The net effect was negligible as shipbuilding in the United States declined almost equally with the benefits gained.

United States entry into the war just over two months after the board began its work completely changed the focus from general strengthening the nation's maritime position to a massive wartime program. Though it was sometimes referred to as the War Shipping Board, the official title remained the United States Shipping Board.

The USSB was to address the shortage of shipping through acquisition of existing hulls and, with the declaration of war by the United States on 6 April 1917, a construction program through its Emergency Fleet Corporation (EFC) that was created 16 April. The precedent for using such a corporation had been set during the construction of the Panama Canal during which the Panama Railway Company, charged with much of the construction, had its stock entirely owned by the Secretary of War. The Shipping Act had explicitly empowered the USSB to found such a company and that was done with issuance of $50,000,000 in stock all initially held by the USSB and of which a majority portion must be retained with a provision that trustees of the EFC must also hold stock. During the war Congress granted the President extraordinary wartime powers that were used by means of Executive Orders to expand the authority of USSB and its corporation. The USSB, as a regulatory and policy body, executed its programs largely through the EFC which was a separate entity that was fully under the policy control of the majority stockholder, the USSB. The Chairman of the USSB was initially the head of the EFC but the General Manager had all real authority except the power to sign contracts.

The division of authority between the USSB and EFC and the construction program's direction led to conflict between Chairman Denman and the EFC's General Manager, Major-General Goethals, resulting in the resignation of both men and reconstitution of the board and corporation. The new USSB composition that remained throughout the war was Edward N. Hurley, chairman, with Raymond B. Stevens replacing  James B. White as vice-chairman and John Donald, Bainbridge Colby and Charles R. Page as members. Rear Admiral Washington L. Capps, formerly Constructor of the Navy and Chief of the Navy's Bureau of Construction, became the General Manager of the EFC.

World War I
Shipbuilding prior to the entry of the United States into World War I had been expanded to some extent with domestic shipping companies replacing ships withdrawn from trade by belligerents and both the United Kingdom and neutrals contracting for ships in U.S. yards. The U.K. had contracted for ships through private British companies both for security and U.S. neutrality needs. In March 1917, just before U.S. entry into the war and the USSB shifting to full wartime operations, there were about 700,000 tons of new construction underway for the private U.K. owners and all 234 building ways in the U.S. occupied by either those or ships for neutral and domestic shipping lines. There was no possibility to quickly expand capacity to incorporate the USSB/EFC shipbuilding program.

Providing hulls

Interned enemy ships

The most readily available hulls were 91 German vessels of  aggregate tonnage refurbished for use by the USSB and under legislation of 12 May 1917 and an Executive Order of 30 June 1917 giving the USSB power to formally seize the vessels and enter them into the U.S. registry. The report of December 1918 shows 1 Austrian steamer, 87 German steamers that now included 4 from Cuba, and 7 sailing vessels seized.

On 15 November 1917 the USSB authorized negotiations with foreign countries that had seized German or Austrian ships with actual discussions during December and into January 1918. The result was either charter or outright purchase of a number of ships interned from South America to China.

Commandeering existing construction

The first order was signed by Chairman Hurley on 3 August 1917 to be executed by the EFC to secure control of the shipyards and construction already underway. The action was immediately protested by nearly every shipyard and owner of the ships under construction with the foreign owners protesting through the State Department. A large number of the contracts and ships under construction for foreign accounts were for the United Kingdom and the protest was solved with that government's agreement that the ships would be used in the total war effort. With one exception, a new ship from Union Iron Works already loaded for departure named War Sword, the contracts and ships were requisitioned.

Out of 431 such ships, totaling , requisitioned 414 were completed after cancellations of some contracts for ships of unwanted design that were in early stages of construction or not yet laid down. A very large group of these ships, contracted with names prefixed with "War" and renamed before completion, were being built for the British Shipping Controller of Ministry of Shipping under various shipping line contracts.

Construction program
The Board's construction program, most notably the Hog Islander ships, was executed through Emergency Fleet Corporation which it established 16 April 1917.

The shipbuilding program was concluded with the 9 May 1922 delivery of the ship completed and delivered as Western World, launched as Nutmeg State 17 September 1921, by Bethlehem Shipbuilding Corporation at Sparrows Point, Maryland.

Ship management
When ships were delivered from the builder to the USSB they came under the management of the Division of Operations which allocated them to the War Department, Navy Department or commercial service based on needs and the class and type of ship. By December 1918 the division had become the largest ship operating entity in U.S. history with a total fleet of 1,386 vessels totaling  either owned outright, managed or chartered.

To further control traffic required by the war effort, methods applied by the British were employed in which rates were adjusted and control was exercised through the division's Chartering Committee, whose approval was necessary to obtain license to refuel in U.S. ports. With U.S. registered ships already under tight control, these regulations were largely directed at neutrals. A specific example was the preferred trade by neutrals in manganese with eastern South America, when the war effort required nitrates from the west coast countries so that the board's efforts were directed to shift the balance. Enforcement of rates was strict and at one point, before wide compliance, 136 steamers were held in U.S. ports. By December 1918, the USSB directly controlled such a large portion of U.S. shipping through ownership and charter that the USSB's prewar rate setting regulatory function had largely become a minor factor.

A Maritime Intelligence Department within the division and a separate Division of Planning and Statistics collected and analyzed shipping data in order to help determine what level of shipping was necessary for commerce and how much could be shifted to the war effort.

Ship manning
As of 1 June 1917, the USSB established a recruiting service with headquarters in Boston, with the first of an eventual 43 training centers, in recognition that traditional methods were too slow for the rapid wartime expansion, for deck officers at Cambridge, Massachusetts on 4 June. A second set of schools was created for engineering officers, with those for engineers destined for turbine powered ships sent to the builders of turbines for training. The early result, between 1 June 1917 and 1 October 1918 was 11,618 licensed officers. The officer training was expanded to training for crew, deck sailors, firemen, wipers, cooks and stewards, by December 1917 and open to all male citizens between the ages of 18 through 20 and 32 though 35 with a goal expanded from an estimated 85,000 to 200,000 due to the revised estimates of ships by the end of the war.

To ensure labor problems did not disrupt necessary war shipping, the USSB employed special labor consultants and entered into agreements with labor and other government agencies to resolve labor disputes directly and also standardize wages across the industry. One of the USSB organizations specifically concerned with the issue was the Marine and Dock Industrial Relations Division to coordinate all labor related matters, and by late 1918 industry and labor had begun referring disputes to the board and thus avoiding any stoppages.

National Adjustment Commission 
The National Adjustment Commission was established in 1917 as an adjunct to the USSB, for the adjustment and control of wages, hours, and conditions of labor in the loading and unloading of vessels. In 1918 the initial operation and policies of the commission was agreed to between the USSB and the following parties:
 Secretary of War
 Secretary of Labor
 American Federation of Labor
 International Longshoremen's Association
 major shipping companies on the Atlantic and Gulf coasts.
Subsequently, additional shipping companies and labor organizations entered into the agreement, with modifications. William Z. Ripley was chairman of the commission in 1919–1920.

In July 1920 the USSB withdrew from the commission agreement and decided to deal with shipping workers directly. The commission ceased operations on October 1, 1920.

Post war and abolishment

The USSB operated a shipping business with its surplus ships until 1920 when the overseas freight market collapsed and it began to lay up its vessels.  In 1925 Henry Ford bought 199 of these out of service ships for $1,697,470 as part of an investigation into the secondary use of materials.  The first ship reached the Ford River Rouge Complex in November the same year and all the remaining ships were broken down and recycled the following summer.

The USSB was abolished effective March 2, 1934.

Its successor agencies have been the U.S. Shipping Board Bureau of the U.S. Department of Commerce (1933–36); the U.S. Maritime Commission (1936–50); the U.S. Federal Maritime Board of the Department of Commerce (regulatory functions only, 1950–61); the U.S. Federal Maritime Commission (regulatory functions only, 1961– ); the United States Maritime Administration of the Department of Commerce (all other functions, 1950–81); and the U.S. Maritime Administration of the U.S. Department of Transportation (all other functions, 1981– ).

U.S. Shipping Commissioners 

 1920–1921 Joseph Nathan Teal
1921 - 1923 Albert Lasker
1923 - Edward P. Farley

From 1924 to 1933, the board was instead chaired by T. V. O'Connor.

References

Bibliography

National Archives: Records of the United States Shipping Board

External links
 United States Government Ships (1923 Munson Line brochure reproduced at Maritime Timetable Images)
 Business Digest and Investment Weekly July 11, 1917 note of seizure of German ships and listing

Shipping Board
Government agencies established in 1916
Government agencies disestablished in 1934
1916 establishments in the United States
1934 disestablishments in the United States